Pitch Dark is a 1983 modernist novel by Renata Adler about a newspaper reporter's affair with a married man. Decades after falling out of print, Pitch Dark was reissued in 2013 by New York Review Books simultaneously with Adler's first novel, Speedboat; both works enjoyed a renewed wave of critical acclaim.

References

1983 American novels
Novels about writers
Alfred A. Knopf books